Brown v. Van Braam, 3 U.S. (3 Dall.) 344 (1797), was a United States Supreme Court case holding that: "Under the practice of the courts of Rhode Island, as adopted by the judiciary act, (1 U. S. Stats, at Large, 73,) the entry of a default, after a plea of the general issue, no similar being on the record, does not operate a discontinuance, and a judgment on the default is valid. Under the same practice the court may assess the damages in an action of assumpsit on a foreign bill payable in pounds sterling. Interest on affirmance is to be calculated on the aggregate sum of principal and interest in the judgment below, to the time of affirmance, but no further.."

See also
 List of United States Supreme Court cases, volume 3

References

External links
 

United States Supreme Court cases
United States Supreme Court cases of the Ellsworth Court
1797 in United States case law